Keilor Stadium is an Australian indoor arena that caters to both basketball and netball. It is located in Keilor Park, a north-western suburb of Melbourne, Victoria.

From 1987 until 1990, the stadium was the home of National Basketball League team the Westside Melbourne Saints.

In 2015, a AU$6.5 million refurbishment of the almost 30 year old stadium was completed with 3 extra courts being built. The new courts were officially opened on 7 December.

References

Sports venues in Melbourne
Defunct National Basketball League (Australia) venues
Basketball venues in Australia
Netball venues in Victoria (Australia)